Kathinka von Deichmann (born 16 May 1994) is a professional tennis player from Liechtenstein.

Von Deichmann has won 15 singles and four doubles titles on the ITF Women's Circuit. On 8 October 2018, she reached her best singles ranking of world No. 153, and on 17 July 2017, she peaked at No. 343 in the WTA doubles rankings.

At the 2018 US Open, von Deichmann made tennis history for her country by becoming the first Liechtensteiner to reach the main draw of singles of a Grand Slam, after winning three matches in the qualifying tournament. She defeated Priscilla Hon in the first qualifying round, Gail Brodsky in round 2 and finally Martina Trevisan also in straight sets to reach the main draw. She then lost by retirement to fellow qualifier, Anhelina Kalinina, 6–1, 6–7, 2–6 in the first round.

Playing for Liechtenstein Fed Cup team, von Deichmann has a win–loss record of 23–14.

She paired with Yvonne Meusburger for her WTA Tour debut at the 2014 Nürnberger Versicherungscup in doubles, losing in the first round.

Grand Slam singles performance timeline

ITF Circuit finals

Singles: 25 (15 titles, 10 runner–ups)

Doubles: 12 (4 titles, 8 runner–ups)

Fed Cup/Billie Jean King Cup participation

Singles

Doubles

References

External links

 
 
 

1994 births
Living people
People from Vaduz
Liechtenstein female tennis players